A total solar eclipse occurred on August 29, 1867. A solar eclipse occurs when the Moon passes between Earth and the Sun, thereby totally or partly obscuring the image of the Sun for a viewer on Earth. A total solar eclipse occurs when the Moon's apparent diameter is larger than the Sun's, blocking all direct sunlight, turning day into darkness. Totality occurs in a narrow path across Earth's surface, with the partial solar eclipse visible over a surrounding region thousands of kilometres wide.
Totality occurred across central Argentina and the southern Atlantic ocean.

Observations

José J. Vergara and Luis Grosch observed the eclipse from a small hill close to Santiago.

Related eclipses 
It is a part of solar Saros 123.

References

 NASA chart graphics
 Googlemap
 NASA Besselian elements
 

1867 08 29
1867 in science
1867 08 29
August 1867 events